The World Judo Juniors Championships are the highest level of international judo competition for juniors, 21 years of age or less. The championships are held once every year (except the years when the Olympics take place) by the International Judo Federation, and qualified judoka compete in their respective categories as representatives of their home countries. The World Junior Championships are the only junior event awarding ranking points for the seniors world ranking list. The last edition of the championships took place in Guayaquil, Ecuador in 2022.

Competitions

Team competitions

Point Contribution to Senior World Ranking List 
Since 2021, World Junior Championships have contributed ranking points equal to an IJF Grand Prix for the Senior World Ranking List. The points also count towards Olympic Games qualification

References

 
Juniors
World Championships, Junior
World Championships, Junior
Judo, Junior
Recurring sporting events established in 1974